This is a list of airlines currently operating in Gabon:

See also
 List of defunct airlines of Gabon
 List of airports in Gabon
 List of airlines
 List of air carriers banned in the European Union
 List of companies based in Gabon

References

Gabon
Airlines
Airlines
Gabon